General Yi Si-ae (korean:이시애, hanja:李施愛, ? – August 12, 1467) was a Korean Joseon Dynasty politician and soldier who led a rebellion against King Sejo for his centralization policy in the northern provinces.

Background
Yi Si-ae was from a local noble family who had lived in Kilju for generations. His clan lived in several towns in Hamgildo. He first served as Heungjin's military commander in 1458, deputy commander in 1461, and magistrate of Hoeryong City in 1463. In the early Joseon Dynasty, the royal court used the province as a policy of conciliation with the Jurchens. Hamgildo (the place name of Hamgyeong-do at the time) was the hometown of King Yi Seong-Gye, the birthplace of the Joseon Dynasty. Taejo established this area as his base of power, subjugating the Jurchen Tribes and increasing his strength. During Sejong's era, the river area expanded up to the Tuman River, and the people of Samnam-ni, Gangwon moved to make Hamgildo a province. However, in a situation where they always had to face off against the Jurchen raids, it was necessary to make enormous human and material sacrifices to defend Hamgildo, which put a tremendous burden on the people of Hamgildo. After the founding of the Joseon Dynasty, to effectively rule and protect Hamgildo and give preference to the birthplace of the royal family, the nobles from the mainland were appointed as local officials and led from generation to generation.

However, after King Sejo came to power, he strengthened the centralization policy to gradually reduce the number of officials from the north and dispatched officials from the south to govern the province, which made Yi and the northerners feel uneasy about his rule. Sejo also passed the Hopae System to regulate the movement of Joseon's subjects further. The nobles in the northern regions feared that they would lose control of the commoners, causing dissatisfaction among the northerners. Moreover, officials sent from the central government harassed the people with projects such as fortifications. 

As a result of regional discrimination against Hamgyeong residents, the people protested against appointed officials from abroad and local councils (Hyangcheong) in Hamgyeong unified their forces against the central government with Yi Si-ae and his family leading them. In response, Yi Si-ae led 30,000 rebels, including the Iksok Force of 4,500, as his vanguard to occupy several areas north of Hamheung, including Dancheon, Hongwon, and Bukcheong counties. Yi Si-ae executed several officials from the central government, such as Kang Hyo-mun. They held the military power in the northeast at the time and an army officer under his command. They killed the villagers and slaughtered the officials of each province, causing a rebellion.

Upon hearing the report of the rebellion, the royal court made Prince Gwiseong commander of the subjugation army of 30,000 with Provincial Commander Yi Jun of Guseong City, Deputy Commander Jo Seok-mun, and Generals Kang Soon, Heo Jong, Kim Gyo, Eo Yuso, and Nam I to suppress the rebellion.  They won the battles in Bukcheong and Manryeong and forced Yi Si-ae to retreat to Kilju. Yi Si-ae's nephew, Heo Yu-rye, and his father, Heo Seung-do, persuaded Yi Si-ae's subordinates, Yi Ju, Yi Un-ro, and Hwang Saeng, to betray Yi Si-ae. They arrested Yi Si-ae and Yi Si-hap and handed them and the rebel leaders over to Nam I's subjugation forces. Yi Si-ae was captured and executed by executed by a thousand cuts which ended the four-month rebellion, and the army carried his head to Hanseong.

See also
List of Koreans
Yi Si-ae's Rebellion

References

External links 
 Lee Si-ae 
 이시애의 난 

1467 deaths
Korean generals
15th-century Korean people
Korean revolutionaries
Executed Korean people
Korean military personnel
Executed military personnel
15th-century executions
Year of birth unknown